The Odd Fellows Temple Building is a landmark building located in downtown Saskatoon, Saskatchewan, Canada.  Built by the Independent Order of Odd Fellows the building served as a meeting place, ball room and temple until being sold in 1959 to the Saskatoon Labour Council.  The building was officially designated a heritage property on April 19, 1983. 

The building served as home to Saskatoon's first library from 1913 to 1923.

References

Buildings and structures in Saskatoon
Buildings and structures completed in 1912
Odd Fellows buildings
1912 establishments in Saskatchewan